Michael Demiurgos is a fictional character primarily in the Lucifer series by DC comics, and is a creation of Neil Gaiman and John Bolton based on the archangel Michael, appearing on an early related series called The Sandman. As an archangel, Michael Demiurgos led God's forces against Lucifer during rebellion in Heaven but failed.

Tom Ellis portrays Michael in the fifth season of the live-action Fox/Netflix series Lucifer, as the brother of Lucifer Morningstar.

Fictional character biography
When the Demiurgic Archangel Lucifer Morningstar began his revolt in Heaven, he was hopelessly outnumbered. He was eventually defeated by his brother the Demiurgic Archangel Michael who used the Demiurgos (God's power) to destroy his angelic forces. However, during the aftermath of the attack a fallen angel named Sandalphon thrust his spear into Michael's back and took him captive into a pocket reality. There Michael was chained to a very large pillar (his physical form at the time being very large) while Sandalphon attempted to create a new generation of warrior angels. All angels are sterile and thus their numbers are not easily repopulated. Using Michael's demiurge to impregnate human women and then gestating the fetuses inside Michael himself, he produced thousands of failures before creating Elaine Belloc with her 300 viable ova. Just as he attempted to claim Elaine, however, Lucifer stepped in.

Easily defeating the cowardly fallen angel Sandalphon, Lucifer took Michael – who never bore animosity towards his brother – and used him as a means to end the then-ongoing assault by the Heavenly Host against his home.  Lucifer had obtained a Letter of Passage outside of Creation due to an earlier arrangement with Heaven. The subsequent doorway had been intended to be one-way and one-time only, but Lucifer bound it open with YHWH, God's own name. To destroy the door would be to unmake Creation.

Unable to allow this, the Heavenly Host had laid siege to Lucifer's home in his absence.  Arriving with Michael, the Host was instantly defeated: if Lucifer were to kill Michael there, the Demiurgic power would wash over Creation, wiping it clean of all life. The Host receded.  Michael, however, remained suffering and awaiting the death promised him by his brother Lucifer. The injured Michael was taken through Lucifer's gate into the Nihilo (nothingness) where Lucifer thrust a sword into him and released the demiurgic power inside Michael, creating his very own cosmos. Having acquired the Demiurgic power over that new Cosmos, Lucifer reconstituted the archangel Michael after the event, but Michael refused Lucifer's offer to stand at his side. This is a theme throughout the comics as the archangel Michael is always offered a form of partnership with his brother Lucifer but often refuses.

Michael is seen as patient and kind, but not someone who will stand by and watch injustice and evil. Initially he is stubborn in following the will of God but later begins to have doubts (exacerbated by his brother Lucifer's enigmatic revelations from time to time). Having been ejected from Heaven for questioning God's wisdom in ordering the death of his daughter, Elaine Belloc, he travels either alone or with the Cherub Gaudium.

Michael's half human/angel daughter Elaine Belloc plays a more prominent role as the Lucifer series continues. Initially guarded in his feelings for her, Michael begins to feel genuine affection and love, which is compounded when Lucifer, having been near fatally injured by the Basanos, is given regeneration by the death/sacrifice of Elaine.

Events take a very serious turn after issue 50 when Fenris the wolf attempts to destroy the World Tree Yggdrasil and upset the balance of all Creation. Having been wounded very badly in his fight against the archangel Lucifer (acting against his own will), Michael tells the now revived Elaine that he loves her and wishes he could have known her better, saying that she must be the holder of the Demiurgos power before he can be allowed to die.

Michael is one of only two angels that Lucifer has respect for (the other being Duma) and is seen as the other side of the coin to Lucifer. The Morningstar himself says that each has what the other lacks. He is tall with very long blonde hair and has two white wings, and he is very powerful when moved to anger. Unlike Lucifer, he won't use creatures as pawns on some chess board, and thus has the humanity that Lucifer sometimes appears to lack.

At his death the two brothers share forgiveness and he passes on. Michael was not close to his daughter and one of his last acts is to voice regret not to have been there for her. Following his death Elaine is just about able to absorb the power and is placed by Yahweh on the road to becoming the new ruler of creation.

Powers and abilities
Michael's power is known to only be matched by his brother Lucifer and surpassed only by God.  His greatest power is the Demiurgic power that allows creation out of nothingness that is contained within him.  Wielding it Michael was able to defeat his brother Lucifer and banish him from Heaven after his rebellion.  The sole limitation on this power is that Michael does not have the ability to give the power shape, thus preventing him from creating.  He needs the power of his brother, the Archangel Lucifer to do that.

Like all Archangels, Michael is immortal and possesses super-strength, super-speed, invulnerability, sonic cry, flight, acidic blood, telepathy, and the power to speak to animals.

In other media
Michael appears in the fifth season of Lucifer, portrayed by Tom Ellis. This version of Michael is depicted as Lucifer's twin brother, and in opposition to Lucifer's nature, he is calculating and scheming, a frequent liar, and is able to bring out people's fears in a manner similar to Lucifer's ability to bring out their desires. Michael orchestrates the retirement of God by convincing Him that he is losing control of his powers, with the intent of take the throne for himself. He finds himself in direct opposition to Lucifer, and ultimately loses their battle to become the next God.

Notes

Characters created by Neil Gaiman
Comics characters introduced in 1990
DC Comics angels
DC Comics characters who can move at superhuman speeds
DC Comics characters who can teleport
DC Comics characters with superhuman strength
DC Comics deities
DC Comics fantasy characters
DC Comics male characters
DC Comics telepaths
DC Comics characters who are shapeshifters
Fictional characters with immortality
Fictional characters who can manipulate reality
Fictional characters who can manipulate sound
Fictional characters with death or rebirth abilities
Fictional characters who can change size
Fictional characters with dimensional travel abilities
Fictional swordfighters in comics
Michael (archangel)
Mythology in DC Comics